Seyyed Mehdi Hasheminasab (born January 27, 1973) is a retired Iranian footballer.

Club career
He served his golden days in Persepolis and Esteghlal.

Club career statistics

International career
After a number of very good seasons with Persepolis, Hasheminasab was called up to the national team, earning his first cap versus Kuwait on February 15, 1999. He was also a member of the national team during the World Cup 2002 qualification campaign. Some consider him and a number of other players to be responsible for the poor atmosphere in the national team camp, and its eventual failure to qualify.  In his career he achieved 28 caps and 2 goals.

References

External links

 Mehdi Hasheminasab at PersianLeague.com
 Mehdi Hasheminasab at TeamMelli.com
 
 Quds Daily
 Tebyan

1973 births
Living people
People from Abadan, Iran
Iranian footballers
Iran international footballers
Iranian expatriate footballers
Expatriate footballers in Turkmenistan
FK Köpetdag Aşgabat players
Esteghlal F.C. players
Persepolis F.C. players
siah Jamegan players
pas players
Sanat Naft Abadan F.C. players
Payam Mashhad players
F.C. Aboomoslem players
Azadegan League players
2000 AFC Asian Cup players
Association football defenders
Sportspeople from Khuzestan province